The 1982 Michigan Secretary of State election was held on November 2, 1982. Incumbent Democrat Richard H. Austin defeated Republican nominee Elizabeth A. Andrus with 67.90% of the vote.

General election

Candidates
Major party candidates
Richard H. Austin, Democratic
Elizabeth A. Andrus, Republican
John L. Wagner, American Independent
Brian Wright, Libertarian

Results

References

1982 Michigan elections
Michigan Secretary of State elections
Michigan
November 1982 events in the United States